The 1944 Oklahoma A&M Cowboys football team represented Oklahoma Agricultural and Mechanical College (later renamed Oklahoma State University–Stillwater) in the Missouri Valley Conference during the 1944 college football season. In their sixth year under head coach Jim Lookabaugh, the Cowboys compiled an 8–1 record (1–0 against conference opponents), won the Missouri Valley championship, defeated TCU in the 1945 Cotton Bowl Classic, and outscored all opponents by a combined total of 228 to 103. They played their home games at Lewis Field in Stillwater, Oklahoma.

On offense, the 1944 team averaged 25.3 points, 196.9 rushing yards, and 126.3 passing yards per game.  On defense, the team allowed an average of 11.4 points, 182.9 rushing yards and 66.0 passing yards per game.

The team's statistical leaders included halfback Bob Fenimore with 897 rushing yards, 861 passing yards, and 53 points scored, and Cecil Hankins with 474 receiving yards.  Fenimore was selected by several selectors (Associated Press, Collier's Weekly, Football News, Football Writers Association of America, and Newspaper Enterprise Association) as a first-team halfback on the 1944 College Football All-America Team. He was later inducted into the College Football Hall of Fame.

Schedule

Rankings
The AP released their first rankings on October 9. The Cowboys entered the rankings on October 30.

After the season

The 1945 NFL Draft was held on April 8, 1945. The following Cowboys were selected.

References

Oklahoma AandM
Oklahoma State Cowboys football seasons
Missouri Valley Conference football champion seasons
Cotton Bowl Classic champion seasons
Oklahoma AandM